Ocala (YTB-805) was a United States Navy  named for Ocala, Florida.

Construction

The contract for Ocala was awarded on 4 March 1969; she was laid down on 20 August of the same year at Sturgeon Bay, Wisconsin by Peterson Builders, and launched on 20 March 1970.

Operational history
Placed in service on 19 September 1970, Ocala was assigned to the Naval Base at La Maddalena, Italy where she served her whole career.

Stricken from the Navy List on 28 October 1997, Ocala was sold by the Defense Reutilization and Marketing Service (DRMS) to McAllister Towing, and renamed Beth M. McAllister.

References

External links
 

 

Natick-class large harbor tugs
Ships built by Peterson Builders
1970 ships